Østbye is a surname. Notable people with the surname include:

Adolf Østbye (1868–1907), Norwegian revue artist and barber
Gudbrand Østbye (1885–1972), Norwegian army officer and historian
Peter Østbye (1855–1943), Norwegian philologist and academic administrator
Rolf Østbye (1898–1979), Norwegian businessman
Sverre Østbye (1889–1984), Norwegian Nordic skier